Pazzawta (or ) was governor of Prome (Pyay) from  1288 to 1305. He was chief minister of Viceroy Thihathu of Prome. According to the Yazawin Thit chronicle, Pazzawta became the de facto governor after Thihathu's death, and was later formally appointed governor by King Kyawswa of Pagan. Main chronicles do not mention him at all.

Notes

References

Bibliography
 
 

Pagan dynasty
Myinsaing dynasty
13th-century Burmese people
14th-century Burmese people